Neil Peter Marshall  (born 6 July 1977) is a former Australian rules footballer who played with the West Coast Eagles in the Australian Football League (AFL).

Marshall, an Indigenous Australian, was a half back flanker who came from Broome originally. He was picked up in the 1995 AFL draft but didn't play a senior game for the Eagles in 1996, instead playing in Claremont's premiership team.

Against Sydney in 1997, at the SCG, he made his league debut and was solid with 13 disposals. He played only once more that year, against Melbourne and in 1998 added just two further games to his tally, participating in wins over Collingwood and Fremantle.

A two time Western Australian interstate representative, Marshall finished his career with Subiaco.

References

External links
 
 

1977 births
Australian rules footballers from Western Australia
West Coast Eagles players
Claremont Football Club players
Place of birth missing (living people)
Subiaco Football Club players
Indigenous Australian players of Australian rules football
Living people
People from Broome, Western Australia